Obey Clothing (stylized as OBEY) is a clothing company founded in 2001 by street artist and illustrator Shepard Fairey as an extension to his work in activism. The company appropriates themes and images used in its clothing from the John Carpenter film They Live. 

The brand is known for incorporating politically and socially provocative propaganda into the designs of their clothing.

References 

Clothing brands
Clothing companies of the United States
Clothing companies established in 2001